Teymuraz Edisherashvili (born 26 September 1973) is a Russian wrestler. He competed in the men's Greco-Roman 100 kg at the 1996 Summer Olympics.

References

External links
 

1973 births
Living people
Russian male sport wrestlers
Olympic wrestlers of Russia
Wrestlers at the 1996 Summer Olympics
Place of birth missing (living people)
20th-century Russian people